Marinobacter oulmenensis is a Gram-negative, aerobic and moderately halophilic bacterium from the genus of Marinobacter which has been isolated from brine from Sabkha in Ain Oulmene in Algeria.

References

Further reading

External links
Type strain of Marinobacter oulmenensis at BacDive -  the Bacterial Diversity Metadatabase

Alteromonadales
Bacteria described in 2011
Halophiles